Andrew Hamilton (born 17 October 1971 in Bundaberg, Queensland) is an Australian former professional rugby league footballer who played as a  and  forward in the 1990s and 2000s.

He played for the London Broncos in the Super League and also for the South Queensland Crushers, the Ipswich Jets, the Norths Devils and Queensland Residents in Australia. He played 30 Super League Games and 7 ARL First Grade Games at the top level. He was chosen in the Queensland Cup team of the decade 1995-2005 along with Fans Queensland Cup team of the decade 1995-2005

References

External links
 SL stats
Rugby League Project stats

1971 births
Living people
Australian rugby league players
Ipswich Jets players
London Broncos players
Norths Devils players
Rugby league locks
Rugby league players from Bundaberg
Rugby league second-rows
South Queensland Crushers players